Margot Clyne (born February 27, 1995) is an American professional racing cyclist, who is the record holder for Pikes Peak HC.  She currently rides for UCI Women's Continental Team .

References

External links
 

1995 births
Living people
American female cyclists
Place of birth missing (living people)
21st-century American women